WDCT AM 1310 is a Korean broadcast radio station licensed to Fairfax, Virginia, the only Korean language station serving Northern Virginia, Washington, D.C., and Maryland. WDCT is operated and licensed to Yoonhee Kim and Yongyil Kim of Bareun Media Inc.

Origins of AM 1310 
WDCT was originally a Korean religious formatted broadcast radio station, serving Northern Virginia. WDCT was owned and operated by Kwang Ok Sung and Suk Chan Lee, through licensee KBC Broadcasting Inc.

References

External links
 

1955 establishments in Virginia
Asian-American culture in Virginia
Korean-language radio stations in the United States
Radio stations established in 1955
DCT
Fairfax, Virginia